Amable Quiambao (January 19, 1947 – July 5, 2013), better known by her stage name, Ama Quiambao, was a Filipino film, television and theater actress in the Philippines.  She was best known for her roles in the films Himala and Diablo.

Early life
She was born Amable Quiambao on January 19, 1947 in Bacacay, Albay and had two siblings: Medgardo and Lui.

Personal life
She was married to former actor and bass-baritone opera singer Gamaliel "Gammy" Viray.  The couple had only one son, Ishmael Viray. Her sister, Lui Quiambao-Manansala, is also an actress and her niece, Miriam Quiambao, was a former Binibining Pilipinas Universe winner and 1st runner-up at the Miss Universe 1999. She was also a former instructor of St. Paul University Quezon City for the students of AB Mass Communications.

Theatre
Quiambao began her career as a theatre actress. Her first play was "Ang Mga Tagahabi", directed by Rolando Tinio (an adaptation of The Weavers by Gerhart Hauptmann), when she was a drama student at the Philippine Normal University in Manila in the 1970s. She later earned her Master's degree in Drama Education from the University of the Philippines.  She became a regular performer at the Teatro Pilipino and Bulwagang Gantimpala theatre groups at the Cultural Center of the Philippines in Manila. She played the role of President Corazon Aquino at the 1986 political satire "Bongbong at Kris" at CCP's Bulwagang Gantimpala in 1986.

Film
Ama made her film debut in 1982, when she starred in the movie Himala (Miracle), directed by Ishmael Bernal. Film director Bernal wanted to cast theatre and radio actors in Himala, so theatre director Rolando Tinio recommended the casting of Quiambao. She was chosen for the role of Sepa, a disciple of the lead character Elsa, played by Nora Aunor.  Her role in Himala earned her a Best Supporting Actress nomination at the Gawad Urian Awards in 1982.  She subsequently appeared in many other films. A restored version of Himala was screened at the 2012 Venice Film Festival to mark its 30th anniversary.

Three decades later, Quiambao was cast as Lusing in the 2012 film, Diablo, which was directed and produced by the married partners Mes de Guzman and Rhea Operaña de Guzman. Lusing was a very serious, strict character in the film, which Quiambao described as the opposite of her own personality.

Her work in Diablo earned Quiambao the first acting award of her career. In 2012, she won "Best Actress in the New Breed category" at the 8th Cinemalaya Independent Film Festival. In a later interview, Quiambao described her reaction to winning, "I was strangely calm,” she recalled. “I didn’t feel cold; I didn’t cry. I was glad that the trophy was presented to me by Iza [Calzado]. I’ve worked with her a number of times on TV and in the movies. I love that girl." She also said that she was thrilled to see other veteran Filipino actors win Cinemalaya awards that year, including Anita Linda and Eddie Garcia, which she called "the night of senior citizens."

Death
Quiambao suffered a heart attack on June 28, 2013, while attending the premiere of the one-act play, Pamamanhikan, in which she was performing as part of the Virgin Labfest 9 theatre festival. She died at Capitol Medical Center in Quezon City at 8:09 p.m. on July 5, 2013, at the age of 65. Her funeral was held at the Arlington Memorial Chapels in Quezon City. Her younger sister, Lui Quiambao-Manansala, said that "she was surrounded by all members of her family and close relatives. Let us pray for the eternal rest of her soul... Let us all remember Ama with fondness as a colleague, a mentor and a friend." Quiambao's wake was held at Arlington Memorial Chapels in Quezon City.

Quiambao appeared posthumously in her final film, Ang Kwento Ni Mabuti.

Filmography

Film

Television

References

External links

1947 births
2013 deaths
Bicolano people
People from Albay
Bicolano actors
Filipino film actresses
Filipino stage actresses
Filipino television actresses
University of the Philippines alumni
GMA Network personalities
ABS-CBN personalities
Philippine Normal University alumni